Lillian Georgina Frank  (16 January 1930 – 12 August 2022) was a Burmese-born Australian hairdresser, fashion influencer, philanthropist, fundraiser, and society columnist.

Life
Lillian Georgina Jacob was born in Rangoon, Burma (now Yangon, Myanmar), in 1930. Her family fled to British India during World War II, from where she was sent to live with an aunt in the United Kingdom. She finally settled in Melbourne, Australia, in the 1950s. 

She established her first hairdressing salon in the city, and she later opened one in Toorak, Victoria. She became known for her celebrity clientele, including Queen Elizabeth II and Jean Shrimpton. She wrote a gossip column for the Herald Sun for about 40 years.

She married Richard Frank in 1966, and they had two daughters. 

Lillian Frank died on 12 August 2022, aged 92.

Honours
	1977 – Appointed a Member of the Order of the British Empire (MBE), for services to charities (she was highly involved in charities such as the Royal Children's Hospital and Odyssey House, Melbourne)
	1991 – Appointed a Member of the Order of Australia (AM), for service to the community 
	2001 – Awarded the Centenary Medal, for services to the community through fund-raising and charity

References

1930 births
2022 deaths
Burmese emigrants to Australia
Businesspeople from Melbourne
Philanthropists from Melbourne
Australian hairdressers
Australian columnists
Australian women columnists
Members of the Order of Australia
Australian Members of the Order of the British Empire
Recipients of the Centenary Medal
People from Melbourne